Jiang Peng (Chinese: 姜鹏; born 6 March 1989 in Dalian, Liaoning) is a Chinese football player.

Club career
In 2010, Jiang Peng started his professional footballer career with Liaoning Whowin in the Chinese Super League. He would eventually make his league debut for Liaoning on 28 September 2012 in a game against Tianjin Teda.

Club career statistics 

Statistics accurate as of match played 4 November 2014

References

1989 births
Living people
Chinese footballers
Footballers from Dalian
Liaoning F.C. players
Association football midfielders
Chinese Super League players